Onciderini is a tribe of longhorn beetles of the subfamily Lamiinae, they are prevalent across Europe in nations such as Turkey, and Finland.

Taxonomy

 Agaritha
 Alexera
 Apamauta
 Apocoptoma
 Bacuris
 Bucoides
 Cacostola
 Carenesycha
 Cherentes
 Chitron
 Cicatrodea
 Cipriscola
 Clavidesmus
 Cnemosioma
 Cordites
 Cydros
 Cylicasta
 Delilah
 Ecthoea
 Ephiales
 Esonius
 Eudesmus
 Eupalessa
 Euthima
 Furona
 Glypthaga
 Hesycha
 Hesychotypa
 Hypselomus
 Hypsioma
 Iaquira
 Ischiocentra
 Ischioderes
 Ischiosioma
 Jamesia
 Japi
 Lachaerus
 Lachnia
 Lesbates
 Leus
 Lingafelteria
 Lochmaeocles
 Lydipta
 Marensis
 Microcanus
 Midamiella
 Monneoncideres
 Neocherentes
 Neodillonia
 Neohylus
 Neolampedusa
 Oncideres
 Oncioderes
 Onocephala
 Paratrachysomus
 Paratritania
 Pericasta
 Periergates
 Peritrox
 Plerodia
 Priscatoides
 Prohylus
 Proplerodia
 Pseudobeta
 Pseudoperma
 Psyllotoxoides
 Psyllotoxus
 Sternycha
 Stethoperma
 Strioderes
 Sulpitus
 Taricanus
 Tibiosioma
 Touroultia
 Trachysomus
 Trestoncideres
 Trestonia
 Tritania
 Tulcoides
 Tulcus
 Tybalmia
 Typhlocerus
 Ubytyra
 Venustus
 Xylomimus

References

 
Lamiinae
Beetle tribes